Ioan I. Cantacuzino (also Ion Cantacuzino; 25 November 1863 – 14 January 1934) was a renowned Romanian physician and bacteriologist, a professor at the School of Medicine and Pharmacy of the University of Bucharest, and a titular member of the Romanian Academy. He established the fields of microbiology and experimental medicine in Romania, and founded the Ioan Cantacuzino Institute.

Early days
He was born in Bucharest as a member of the Cantacuzino family and the son of Ion C. Cantacuzino. After attending the Lycée Louis-le-Grand in Paris, he graduated from the University of Paris' Faculty of Sciences and Faculty of Medicine, and worked at several hospitals in Paris. He obtained his doctorate in 1894, with thesis Recherches sur le mode de destruction du vibrion cholérique dans l'organisme. Later in the same year, he began his academic career as a deputy professor at the University of Iași, and returned to Paris after two years to serve on the staff of the Pasteur Institute, where he worked under the direction of Ilya Ilyich Mechnikov.

Career
In 1901, Cantacuzino was assigned a teaching position in Bucharest, where he became a major influence on a generation of scientists. His discoveries were relevant in the treatment of cholera, epidemic typhus, tuberculosis, and scarlet fever. As a disciple of Mechnikov, he devoted part of his research to expanding on the latter's field of interest (phagocytes, the body's means of defence against pathogens, as well as the issue of immunity and invertebrates). He invented the notion of contact immunity.

During the Second Balkan War, Cantacuzino was appointed head of the staff combatting the cholera epidemic in the ranks of the Romanian Army stationed in Bulgaria; he was assigned to the same position during the Romanian campaign in World War I, in the fight against typhus. He founded and led the scientific magazines Revista Științelor Medicale and Archives roumaines de pathologie expérimentale, and regularly contributed to the literary magazine Viața Românească (replacing Paul Bujor on the editorial board). A collaborator of Constantin Stere, he was noted as a Poporanist disciple of Constantin Dobrogeanu-Gherea.

References

External links

Short biography
  Ion Mesrobeanu, Viaţa şi opera profesorului Ion Cantacuzino

1863 births
1934 deaths
Ioan
Romanian inventors
Romanian military doctors
Romanian bacteriologists
Romanian Ministers of Health
Romanian Ministers of Labor
Romanian socialists
Titular members of the Romanian Academy
Romanian Land Forces officers
Romanian magazine editors
Poporanists
Romanian military personnel of World War I
Academic staff of Alexandru Ioan Cuza University
University of Paris alumni
Physicians from Bucharest
Lycée Louis-le-Grand alumni
Academic staff of the Carol Davila University of Medicine and Pharmacy
Romanian expatriates in France